Transformers: Robots in Disguise, originally known as , is a Japanese anime television series based on the Transformers franchise. The series was produced by Nihon Ad Systems and Studio Gallop, in cooperation with Korean company Dongwoo Animation, aired in Japan in 2000. 

Conceived as a reboot to the franchise, with a self-contained continuity separate from any previous incarnation, A localized English adaptation aired as part of the Fox Kids programming block in the United States from September 8, 2001 to March 30, 2002.

Plot
While attempting to stop the Predacons from stealing Earth's energy, the Autobots ally themselves with Koji Onishi after Predacon leader Megatron captures the boy's father, Dr. Kenneth Onishi. Amidst their battles, the Autobots and Predacons discover the location of a crashed spaceship from their home planet, Cybertron, containing six Autobot protoforms. Megatron reaches it first and reprograms the protoforms into the evil Decepticons. In light of this, Predacon sub-commander Sky-Byte attempts to prove his worth to Megatron by stealing the Autobots' O-Parts. Meanwhile, Ultra Magnus, the bitter brother of Autobot leader Optimus Prime, arrives on Earth to claim the latter's Matrix for his own, only for the brothers to gain the ability to merge into Omega Prime.

The Autobots and Predacons eventually discover Fortress Maximus, a giant Transformer hidden on Earth to protect it. While they race to claim its power, Sky-Byte accidentally frees Dr. Onishi, who joins the Autobots to help them locate all of the O-Parts necessary to find the Orb of Sigma. While Megatron finds it and uses its power to become Galvatron, the Orb leads the Autobots to Cerebros, Fortress Maximus' power key. A final battle soon ensues between Galvatron and Omega Prime, who eventually prevails and brings the Decepticons and most of the Predacons back to Cybertron to face justice while Sky-Byte stealthily escapes into Earth's oceans.

Release

Episodes
The three clip shows of Robots in Disguise differ between the English and Japanese versions. Both are listed at the appropriate numbers.

Reception

References

External links
Official NAS website 

2000 anime television series debuts
2000 Japanese television series debuts
2000 Japanese television series endings
Gallop (studio)
Japanese children's animated action television series
Japanese children's animated adventure television series
Japanese children's animated science fantasy television series
Japanese children's animated superhero television series
TV Tokyo original programming
Super robot anime and manga
Robots in Disguise
Television series by Saban Entertainment